Log Hollow Falls (also known as Falls in Log Hollow, or the Falls on Log Hollow Creek) is a waterfall in the Pisgah National Forest, Transylvania County, North Carolina. It's a steep cascade with a couple of sections of free falling water. Visitors can drive to within 1/2 miles of the falls, and access them via an old Forest Service logging road, making it an easy destination. Despite this, the falls aren't very well known and receives few visitors.

References

Protected areas of Transylvania County, North Carolina
Waterfalls of North Carolina
Pisgah National Forest
Waterfalls of Transylvania County, North Carolina